The 2018 1. divisjon (referred to as OBOS-ligaen for sponsorship reasons) was a Norwegian second-tier football league season. 

The season began on 2 April 2018 and ended on 11 November 2018 (not including playoff matches).

Team changes from 2017
In the 2017 1. divisjon, Bodø/Glimt, Start and Ranheim were promoted to the 2018 Eliteserien, while Fredrikstad, Elverum and Arendal were relegated to the 2018 2. divisjon.

Sogndal, Aalesund and Viking were relegated from the 2017 Eliteserien, while HamKam, Nest-Sotra and Notodden were promoted from the 2017 2. divisjon.

Teams

Stadia and personnel

Managerial changes

League table

Positions by round

Results

Play-offs

Promotion play-offs

The 3rd to 6th placed teams took part in the promotion play-offs; these were single leg knockout matches. In the first round, the 3rd placed team played at home against the 6th placed team, and the 4th placed team played at home against the 5th placed team. The two winners then played against each other in the second round, where the team with the highest table position played at home. The winner of the second round, Aalesund, advanced to play the 14th placed team in Eliteserien over two legs in the Eliteserien play-offs for a spot in the top-flight next season.

First round

Second round

Relegation play-offs

The 14th placed team, Åsane, took part in a two-legged play-off against KFUM Oslo, the winners of the 2. divisjon play-offs, to decide who would play in the 2019 1. divisjon. KFUM Oslo won 4-3 on aggregate and were therefore promoted, while Åsane got relegated.

KFUM Oslo won 4–3 on aggregate.

Season statistics

Top scorers

Top assists

Attendances

Awards

References

Norwegian First Division seasons
1
Norway
Norway